Ion Brătianu National College may refer to one of two educational institutions in Romania:

Ion Brătianu National College (Haţeg)
Ion Brătianu National College (Pitești)